Bathoen I (1845 – 1 July 1910) was a kgosi (paramount chief) of the Ngwaketse people (1889-1910). Together with Khama III and Sebele I he is credited with saving the young British Bechuanaland Protectorate, a predecessor of Botswana, from being absorbed by expansionist forces in the 1890s.

Bathoen was the son of Gaseitsiwe, and eventually succeeded him as the kgosi. He married Gagoangwe, who eloped with him in 1875, formalized in a Christian ceremony in 1890. Their oldest son, Seepapitso III, succeeded Bathoen.

In 1889, the British South Africa Company founded by Cecil Rhodes started to expand north, and the Tswana people became afraid that they would be eventually deposed from their lands. In response, Khama III, Sebele I, and Bathoen I, being mandated by their people,  travelled to London, made public speeches in support of their causes, and finally convinced Queen Victoria to ring-fence the Bechuanaland Protectorate, which would preserve the self-government institutes of Tswana, and the British would only have limited authority, such as for example a control over the railway to be built. In 1908, he led the protests by the Tswana against planned incorporation of Bechuanaland into South Africa.

Bathoen I, together with Khama III and Sebele I, is depicted on the 100 Botswana pula banknote issued in 2009. The Three Dikgosi Monument in Gaborone also commemorates the mission of the three chiefs to Great Britain.

References

1845 births
1910 deaths
Bechuanaland Protectorate people
Botswana chiefs